John Harris Bettles (1907–1983) was an England international lawn bowler.

Bowls career
He won a gold medal in the fours at the 1958 British Empire and Commonwealth Games in Cardiff with Norman King, John Scadgell and Walter Phillips.

Personal life
He took up bowls in 1931 and was shoe and boot operative by trade.

References

1907 births
1983 deaths
English male bowls players
Commonwealth Games medallists in lawn bowls
Commonwealth Games gold medallists for England
Bowls players at the 1958 British Empire and Commonwealth Games
Medallists at the 1958 British Empire and Commonwealth Games